The yellow-spotted woodland salamander (Plethodon pauleyi) is a species of salamander in the family Plethodontidae. It is endemic to the United States, where it is distributed throughout the Cumberland Plateau in the states of Kentucky and Tennessee. Its natural habitat is temperate forest. It was long considered to be both an isolated western population and a unique yellow-spotted color morph of the Wehrle's salamander (P. wehrlei), but a study published in 2019 found it to be a distinct species.

References 

Plethodon
Amphibians of the United States
Ecology of the Appalachian Mountains
Amphibians described in 2019
Endemic fauna of the United States